The Hanover–Würzburg high-speed railway was the first of several high-speed railway lines for InterCityExpress traffic that were built in Germany. While technically starting in the village of Rethen and ending at Würzburg Hauptbahnhof, it is a de facto link between Hanover and Würzburg, with stops at Göttingen, Kassel, and Fulda. Early construction started in 1973, the line opening fully in 1991.

At  in length, it is the longest newly built rail line in Germany, and its construction costs are estimated to be about DM 40 million (€20.45 million) per kilometre.

History 

The Deutsche Bundesbahn began construction of the line in 1973. Since it was designed for fast passenger trains as well as for express freight trains, its maximum incline is a mere 1.25%. Combined with the hilly terrain, this made the construction of 61 tunnels and 10 large bridges necessary. Of the 327 km of total length, 120 km are in tunnels, the two longest being the Landrücken Tunnel (10,779 m) south of Fulda, the second longest being the Münden Tunnel (10,525 m) south of Hann. Münden. The highest bridge is the Rombach Valley Bridge near Schlitz at 95 metres.

Notwithstanding 10,700 complaints and 360 lawsuits, the line was opened fully in 1991, though the Würzburg–Fulda part was used by InterCity trains as early as 1988. The standard speed on the line is 250 km/h (155 mph); 280 km/h may be reached by trains running late.

On 1 May 1988 the InterCityExperimental set a new land speed record for railed vehicles at 406.9 km/h (252.8 mph) between Fulda and Würzburg.

On 26 April 2008, trainset 11, travelling as ICE 885, collided with a flock of sheep near Fulda. Both power cars and ten of the 12 non-powered cars derailed. The train came to a stop 1300 meters into the Landrücken Tunnel. 19 of the 130 passengers suffered mostly minor injuries; four of them had to be treated in hospitals.

Safety 

Deutsche Bahn AG keeps special trains for accident assistance ready, when passenger trains are on the line; from midnight to early morning these trains are out of service when the line is used for cargo transport. The trains are hauled by two specially rebuilt Class 714 locomotives and are designed to get firefighters and rescue workers to accident scenes in tunnels and on difficult-to-access sections of track. Both engines are equipped with infrared cameras and remote controls, so that the driver can steer the train into a tunnel from the first (air-tight) car of the train without endangering themselves. The trains are stationed at Hildesheim Hauptbahnhof, Kassel Hauptbahnhof, Fulda and Würzburg Hauptbahnhof. They initially were painted in a bright reddish-orange livery akin to fire engines, but since the late 1990s they have been painted standard DB livery red, apparently to make them less obvious to concerned passengers.

See also 
 High-speed rail in Germany

References

External links 
 

 
High-speed railway lines in Germany
Railway lines in Lower Saxony
Railway lines in Hesse
Railway lines in Bavaria
Transport in Hanover
Buildings and structures in Göttingen (district)
Würzburg